Rājīv (Devanagari: राजीव, Bengali script: রাজীব) is a popular Indian, Bangladeshi, Sri Lankan and Nepalese male name, also spelt Rajeev, Rajive, Rajib, Rajeeb, Rajiva and Rajiba.

It is said that the lotus flower (Nelumbo nucifera), though it grows in muddy water, doesn't accumulate the mud particles onto it; such is the quality described as rājīv. Today, in several Indian languages, including Hindi, Telugu, Bengali, Madheshi, Nepali, Assamese, Marathi and Kannada, rājīv is the word for "lotus flower".

In the Rāmāyaṇa, Rāma's epithets include Rājīv-Lochan, meaning "one whose eyes are like lotus flowers".

Notable people named Rajiv, Rajive or Rajeev
Akshay Kumar, Indian-Canadian actor and martial artist (birth name Rajiv Hari Om Bhatia)
Rajeev, Indian Tamil language actor
Rajiv Anchal, film director
Rajive Bagrodia, American computer scientist
Rajiv Bapna, founder and director of Amkette
Rajeev Bikram Shah, Nepalese politician
Rajiv Dixit, Indian social activist and associated with Swadeshi movement
Rajiv Gandhi, former Prime Minister of India 
Rajiv Goswami, political activist
Rajiv Gupta (technocrat), former general manager of Hewlett Packard's E-speak project
Rajiv Gauba (born 1959), Indian Administrative Service and Home Secretary of India
Rajeev Goyle, United States Congressional candidate from Kansas
Rajeev Khandelwal, Indian actor
Rajiv Joseph, American playwright
Rajiv Kapoor, Indian actor
Rajive Kumar (born 1958), Indian Administrative Service officer and former Chief Secretary of Uttar Pradesh
Rajiv Kulkarni, Indian former cricketer
Rajib Lochan Pegu, Indian politician
Rajiv Mehrotra, Indian journalist
Rajiv Menon,  Indian cinematographer and director
Rajeev Motwani, Indian professor of computer science
Rajiv Ouseph, English professional badminton player
Rajeev Paul, Indian actor
Rajiv Patel, musician
Rajiv Rai, director
Rajeev Ram, American tennis player
Rajiv Pratap Rudy, Bharatiya Janata Party politician
Rajiv Satyal, Indian-American comedian
Rajiv Shah, American government official
Rajiv Singh (born 1958 or 1959), Indian businessman
Rajeev Suri, chief executive officer of Nokia

Notable people named Rajib or Rajeeb
Rajib Ghosh, Indian footballer
Rajib Ghorui, Indian footballer
Rajib Banerjee, Indian politician
Rajib Boro, Indian footballer
Rajib Lochan Pegu, Indian politician
Rajib Dutta (born 1971), Indian former cricketer
Rajib Dutta (born 1980), Indian former cricketer
Rajeeb Dey, British entrepreneur
Rajeeb Samdani, Bangladeshi industrialist and art collector

Notable people named Rajiva
Rajiva Wijesinha, Sri Lankan writer

Indian masculine given names